Ashfordia granulata, common name the "silky snail", is a species of medium-sized air-breathing land snail, a terrestrial pulmonate gastropod mollusk in the family Hygromiidae, the hairy snails and their allies.

This species is sometimes placed in the genus Monacha and known as Monacha granulata.

Distribution
This species is known to occur mainly in:
 Ireland
 Great Britain, England

with small populations in:
 France
 Spain

Description
The 5-7 × 7-9 mm shell is whitish to pale brown and thin, translucent, with fine straight hairs with bulbous bases. There are 5.5-6 convex whorls with deep suture. The aperture is simple with a thin lip or without a lip . It is reflected only at the columellar side. The umbilicus is very narrow and partly covered by the reflected columellar margin. The mantle is with black spots.

Life cycle
The size of the egg is 1 mm.

References

External links
Ashfordia granulata at Animalbase taxonomy,short description, distribution, biology,status (threats), images 
 Image from Habitas

Hygromiidae
Gastropods described in 1830